Cirrhochrista primulina is a moth in the family Crambidae. It is found in New Guinea.

The wingspan is about 26 mm. The forewings are white, suffused with yellow-buff. The costa is deeper yellow up to the middle and there is a dark red-brown and silvery streak beneath it. The antemedial band, medial and postmedial lines are red-brown and silvery. The hindwings are silvery white.

References

Moths described in 1919
Spilomelinae
Moths of New Guinea